In the 1990s there were about twenty-five magazines and periodicals in Saudi Arabia. Editions of some international magazines, including Marie Claire and Madame Figaro, are also published in the country. The Arabic edition of Madame Figaro was started in 2009.

The following is an incomplete list of current and defunct magazines published in the country. They are published in Arabic or other languages.

A
 Ain al-Yaqeen
 Al Arab
 Al Jamila 
 Al Yamamah
 Arrajol

D
  Destination
 DQ Living Magazine

H
 Hia

L
 Lean Magazine
 Lucire KSA

N 
 Nature Arabic Edition

R
 Rotana Magazine

S
 Sayidaty

See also
 Media of Saudi Arabia
 List of newspapers in Saudi Arabia

References

Saudi Arabia
Magazines